Dosuđe (Albanian: Dosugje) is a village in the municipality of Gusinje, Montenegro.

History
The Gjokaj brotherhood of Hoti from Hoti i Vendit founded Dosuđe (Dosugja) in the 18th century.

Demographics
According to the 2011 census, its population was 306.

References

Populated places in Gusinje Municipality